The 10th Pan Arab Games was an international multi-sport event which took place in Algiers, Algeria, between 24 September and 10 October 2004. It witnessed the participation of all Arab League members for the first time – 22 countries participated in 26 sports.

The event was originally scheduled for 2003, but was postponed for a year due to the damage caused by the 2003 Boumerdès earthquake.

Sports
The sports programme incorporated 23 sports for elite athletes and three disability sports. Further to this, cultural and scientific events were included on the schedule for the 2004 Games.





Disability sports
Athletics
Basketball
Goalball

Medal table

Participation
22 countries were represented in the competition – constituting all the members of the Arab League at the time.

References

External links
Archived official website 

 
Pan Arab Games
Pan Arab Games
Pan Arab Games
Pan Arab Games, 2004
Pan Arab Games
Multi-sport events in Algeria
21st century in Algiers
September 2004 sports events in Africa
October 2004 sports events in Africa